Uprising 2: Lead and Destroy is an action/real-time strategy video game developed by Cyclone Studios and published by 3DO  on December 9, 1998 for Microsoft Windows. The game is a direct sequel to Uprising which was developed and published by the same companies. The game allows the player to again take control of the powerful Wraith command tank, and enter the fight with a ruthless horde of enemies called the Kri'iSara, who also appeared in the PlayStation port of the first game. Upon release, critics lauded the game for its graphical presentation and unique style of gameplay, but were displeased with its lack of difficulty and predictable mission structure.

Gameplay
The game offers 36 missions to complete, with 28 of these missions broken up into three mini-campaigns, which the player can complete in any order they desire. Gameplay consists of searching the battlefield for citadel locations and assembling bases to harvest energy and create military units. When faced with an enemy combatant, the player can use their Wraith and call on support from military units the player has created.

Reception

The game received average reviews according to the review aggregation website GameRankings.

The Adrenaline Vault said that while it could have been a great game, Uprising ended up being merely good.

Many game critics complained that game was too easy and that the mission designs were contrived and predictable giving the sense that one has been there before. Despite the negativity, critics and gamers alike were generally pleased with the game overall. Next Generation said that the game "packs enough fast action, deep strategy, and overall intensity to please any gamer, and that's what really counts."

References

External links

1998 video games
Action video games
Cyclone Studios games
Real-time strategy video games
The 3DO Company games
Video games developed in the United States
Windows games
Windows-only games